Francis Ellis may refer to:

 Francis Ellis (colonial administrator), administrator of the English East India Company
 Francis Ellis (cricketer) (1889–?), English cricketer
 Francis Whyte Ellis (1777–1819), British civil servant and scholar of Tamil and Sanskrit

See also  
 Frank Ellis (disambiguation)